One Fiji Party (OFP) was a registered political party in Fiji. It was registered as a political party in August 2014.

The party's president for the 2014 Fijian general election was Sitiveni Suvaki. During elections held on 17 September 2014, the party received 5,839 votes, representing 1.20% of the total number of voters, coming sixth overall and not qualifying for any  parliamentary representation in the 50-member Fijian Parliament.

The party was de-registered on 19 April 2017.

References

Defunct political parties in Fiji
Political parties established in 2014
2014 establishments in Fiji
Political parties disestablished in 2017